Ildefons Cerdà is a railway station on the Llobregat–Anoia Line. It is not properly located in Plaça d'Ildefons Cerdà (a square in the Sants-Montjuïc district of Barcelona), but in the L'Hospitalet de Llobregat municipality, in Catalonia, Spain. The station is situated underneath Gran Via de les Corts Catalanes and was opened in 1987. It is served by Barcelona Metro line 8, Baix Llobregat Metro lines S3, S4 and S8, S9, and commuter rail lines R5, R6, R50 and R60.

The station has also become part of the Barcelona Metro line 10. The new station was officially opened on 23 November 2019 with the name Ciutat de la Justícia, since it is directly serving the Ciutat de la Justícia de Barcelona i l'Hospitalet de Llobregat buildings. The new station is located at a distance of 180 m from the existing Ildefons Cerdà station, without a direct connection (passengers have to exit to the road and walk on the street to move between the stations). However, it is considered in the official maps as an interchange node.

External links

 Information and photos of the station at trenscat.cat 
 Video on train operations at the station on YouTube

Railway stations in Spain opened in 1987
Transport in Sants-Montjuïc
Barcelona Metro line 8 stations
Barcelona Metro line 10 stations
Stations on the Llobregat–Anoia Line
Railway stations located underground in Spain
Railway stations in L'Hospitalet de Llobregat